The 8th Central Committee of the Communist Party of Cuba (CPC) was elected at the 8th CPC Congress on 19 April 2021.

Plenums
The Central Committee is not a permanent institution. It convenes plenary sessions between party congresses, and in this case between the 8th Congress and the 9th Congress. When the CC is not in session, decision-making power was vested in the internal bodies of the CC itself; that is, the Politburo and the Secretariat. None of these bodies are permanent either; typically they convened several times a month.

Members

References

Bibliography

 
2021 disestablishments in Cuba